Dalmanutha is a railway station some 16 km east of Belfast, on the route between Pretoria and Maputo. Named after the farm, which in turn takes its name from a biblical town on the Sea of Galilee (Mark 8:10). The name is said to mean 'house of widowhood'. The area is known to the local inhabitants as Monometsi. A clash between the Bakoni and Matabele occurred here. It was also the scene of the last pitched battle of the Second Anglo-Boer War (1899-1902) which took place from 25 August 1900.

References

Populated places in the Emakhazeni Local Municipality